Nekrasovka is a rural locality (a selo) and the administrative center of Nekrasovsky Selsoviet of Belogorsky District, Amur Oblast, Russia. The population was 432 as of 2018. There are 8 streets being, denisenko street, oktyabrskaya street, school lane, green lane, pasecchnaya street, yubileinaya street, new street and garden street.

Geography 
Nekrasovka is located 6 km from the right bank of the Belaya River, 37 km south of Belogorsk (the district's administrative centre) by road. Novonazarovka is the nearest rural locality.

References 

Rural localities in Belogorsky District